The Five Houses on Avers District is a historic district in Chicago, Illinois, United States.  The district was built between 1892 and 1894 by Frederick B. Townsend. It was designated a Chicago Landmark on March 2, 1994.

References

1890s architecture in the United States
Historic districts in Chicago
Chicago Landmarks